Raymond Walter Charles Pitman (21 February 1933 – 5 June 1998) was an English first-class cricketer. Pitman was a right-handed batsman who bowled right-arm medium-fast.

Pitman first represented a Hampshire side in 1950 when he made his debut for the Hampshire Second XI in the 1950 Minor Counties Championship, with Pitman playing his last match for the Second XI against Surrey Second XI in 1952.

Pitman made his first-class debut for Hampshire 1954 against Oxford University and followed this by making his County Championship debut against Northamptonshire in the same season.

Pitman played 50 first-class matches for Hampshire, with his final match for Hampshire coming in the 1959 county season against the Marylebone Cricket Club at Lord's. In Pitman's 50 first-class matches he scored just 926 runs at a batting average of 13.61, with just a single half century score of 77. Pitman's medium-fast bowling was used rarely, with Pitman taking just a single wicket for the cost of 68 runs.

Pitman represented the Hampshire Second XI in two Second Eleven Championship matches, both against the Kent Second XI.

Following his retirement from cricket, Pitman held a coaching and administrative post at Rydal Penrhos school in Wales. Shortly after Pitman's retirement at the age of 65, he was diagnosed with cancer and subsequently died at Rhos-on-Sea, Denbighshire on 5 June 1998.

External links
Raymond Pitman at Cricinfo
Raymond Pitman at CricketArchive
Matches and detailed statistics for Raymond Pitman

1933 births
1998 deaths
People from New Forest District
English cricketers
Hampshire cricketers
Deaths from cancer in England